Giorgos Provias is a Greek dancer, actor and choreographer, the creator of the  staple Greek "folk" dance Sirtaki.

Work

Credited
"Arhipseftaros", 1971, credited as dance coach
"Εσένα μόνο αγαπώ" (I Only Love You), 1970, dance choreography
Synnefiasmenoi orizontes, 1968, himself
"Etairia thavmaton", 1962, dancer

Uncredited
Sirtaki ("Zorba's dance") in Zorba the Greek
Never on Sunday

References

Further reading
Hē zōē mou hena tragoudi, by Panos Geramanēs, Vasilēs Loumprinēs
Ki hosos uparcheis tha uparcho..., by Κωστας ΜπαλαΧουτης

Greek male dancers
Greek choreographers
Greek male actors
Possibly living people
Year of birth missing
Folk dancers